Bugabashevo (Buğabaş) is a rural locality (a selo) in Mikhaylovsky Selsoviet, Bakalinsky District, Bashkortostan, Russia. The population was 185 as of 2010. There are 2 streets.

Geography 
Bugabashevo is located 20 km southeast of Bakaly (the district's administrative centre) by road. Mikhaylovka is the nearest rural locality.

References 

Rural localities in Bakalinsky District